Roberto Leandro Chen Rodríguez (born 24 May 1994) is a Panamanian professional footballer who plays as a central defender for Salvadoran club FAS. He is also capable of playing on the right side and is good with the ball at his feet.

Club career
Born in Isla Colón, Bocas del Toro, with Chinese heritage, Chen graduated from San Francisco's youth setup, and made his senior debuts in the 2010–11 campaign, aged only 17.

On 3 August 2013 Chen signed a three-year deal with La Liga side Málaga for a $500,000 fee. He made his debut for the Andalusians on the 17th, starting and being booked in a 0–1 loss at Valencia. He played his second match only on 26 October, starting in a 0–5 home loss against Celta de Vigo.

On 17 January 2014, Chen was loaned to Belgian Pro League side Zulte Waregem until the end of the season. He only appeared sparingly, and returned to Málaga in June.

On 22 August 2015 Chen was loaned to Segunda División B side Real Balompédica Linense, for a year.

On 27 July 2016, Chen signed a one-year contract with Categoria Primera A side Rionegro Águilas. He debuted in a 3–2 home loss against Atlético Bucaramanga.

International career
After appearing with the Panama national under-17 and under-20 teams, Chen played his first match with the main squad on 3 September 2011, replacing Luis Moreno on the 56th of a 0–2 home loss against Paraguay. He was also named in the 23-man final squad for 2013 CONCACAF Gold Cup, appearing in all matches as Panama finished second.

On 10 September 2013 Chen scored his first international goal, netting the last of a 2–2 draw against Honduras.

International goals
Scores and results list Panama's goal tally first.

Honours
FAS
 Salvadoran Primera División: Clausura 2021

References

External links

1994 births
Living people
Panamanian footballers
San Francisco F.C. players
La Liga players
Segunda División B players
Málaga CF players
Real Balompédica Linense footballers
Belgian Pro League players
S.V. Zulte Waregem players
Águilas Doradas Rionegro players
C.D. Árabe Unido players
C.D. FAS footballers
Panama international footballers
2013 CONCACAF Gold Cup players
2014 Copa Centroamericana players
2017 CONCACAF Gold Cup players
Panamanian expatriate footballers
Expatriate footballers in Belgium
Expatriate footballers in Spain
Expatriate footballers in Colombia
Expatriate footballers in El Salvador
Panamanian expatriate sportspeople in Colombia
Panamanian expatriate sportspeople in Spain
Panamanian expatriate sportspeople in Belgium
Panamanian expatriate sportspeople in El Salvador
People from Bocas del Toro District
Panamanian people of Chinese descent
Sportspeople of Chinese descent
Association football central defenders